Medicine Hat is a city in Alberta, Canada.

Medicine Hat may also refer to:

Places
Cypress-Medicine Hat, a provincial electoral district since 1993
Medicine Hat (federal electoral district), a federal electoral district since 1908
Medicine Hat (N.W.T. electoral district), a territorial electoral district from 1888 to 1905
Medicine Hat (provincial electoral district), a provincial electoral district since 1905
Brooks-Medicine Hat, a provincial electoral district 
Medicine Hat—Cardston—Warner, a federal district in Alberta, Canada
Medicine Hat Regional Hospital, a medical facility in Medicine Hat, Alberta, Canada
Medicine Hat Arena, a multi-purpose arena in Medicine Hat, Alberta, Canada
Medicine Hat railway station, a railway station in Medicine Hat, Alberta, Canada
Medicine Hat/Schlenker Airport, an airport near Medicine Hat, Alberta, Canada
Medicine Hat Airport, an airport southwest of Medicine Hat, Alberta, Canada
Medicine Hat Ocean, a historic ocean

Education & Associated Institutions
Medicine Hat School District No. 76, a public school board in Medicine Hat, Alberta, Canada
Medicine Hat High School, a high school in Medicine Hat, Alberta, Canada
Medicine Hat College, a public college in southeastern Alberta and southwestern Saskatchewan, Canada

Arts & Literature
Medicine Hat (band), a rock band from Seattle, Washington

Other
HMCS Medicine Hat, a minesweeper that served during WWII for Canada
City of Medicine Hat (sternwheeler), a sternwheeler from Medicine Hat, Alberta, Canada